Thirupanamoor and Karanthai are twin villages about 19 km from Kanchipuram. They host historically important Jain temples containing historical inscriptions. There is a population of local Jains in these and nearby villages.

Thirupanamoor village has a Jain temple dedicated to Lord Pushpadanta that houses a rare gilded plaster image of him, with hundreds of brass images and a library. It is believed to have been the home of Acharya Akalanka Deva. The temple has footprints of Jain munis Dharmasagar, Sudharmasagar and Gajapati Sagar, who attained sallekhana. The village is the ancestral home of Wing Commander Abhinandan Varthaman and his father, retired Air Marshal Simhakutty Varthaman.

The Samadhi of Acharya Akalanka Deva: Between Thirupanamoor and Karanthai lies a memorial with chhatris with footprints of ancient Jain sages including the samadhi of logician and Sanskritist Acharya Akalanka Deva, who is known for his discussion of Anekantavada. He was the founder of the Deva Sangha order of Digambar monks.

Karanthai has a complex of well known Jain temples. This was once a site where Jain munis resided, and hence it is termed Munigiri. This is also the site associated with famed Jain logician Acharya Akalanka (720-780), and hence is also called Akalankabasti. The Jain complex has three temples. The main temple is dedicated to Lord Kunthunath, believed to have been established by Pallava ruler Nandivarma circa 806-896 AD. The Mahavira temple to the south is from the 12th century. The Adinath temple, and the adjacent shrine of Goddess Kushmandini (Ambika) is from the 15th century. A Brhmadeva shrine lies to the southwest.

A panchakalyanaka was conducted there in 1991 and in 2017 to install new Jain images. Every year in Falguna month, a brahmostavam is celebrated. Special worship is conducted on Akshaya Tritiya, Mahavir Jayanti, Diwali, Jinaratri and Vasant Panchami.

The Karanthai complex is famous for its Vijayanagar period murals.

Karandai was the village of the author of classic Tamil text Naṉṉūl, Pavanandi. The Dharumasagar library contains historical manuscripts. It was set up by Jeevabandhu T. S. Sripal in 1930s who was from Thirupanamoor.

This is also the hometown of Abhinandan Varthaman.

See also

Jainism in Tamil Nadu
 Kanchipuram Jainism
Mandalapuruder
Mel Sithamur Jain Math
Trilokyanatha Temple in ThiruparthikundramKanchipuram
Thiruvannamalai

References

Jain temples in Tamil Nadu
Archaeological monuments in Tamil Nadu
9th-century Jain temples